The  is a group of Kofun period burial mounds located in the Hashizu neighborhood of the town of Yurihama, Tottori Prefecture in the San'in region of Japan. The tumulus group was designated a National Historic Site of Japan in 1957.

Overview
The Hashizu Kofun Cluster is  located on the Umanoyama Hill, between the Sea of Japan and Lake Tōgō at an elevation of 107 meters above sea level. The cluster consists of five , which are shaped like a keyhole, having one square end and one circular end, when viewed from above and 19 round tumuli dating from the early to late Kofun period. Of the 24 tumuli, 14 are covered in the National Historic Site designation. 

Of the keyhole-shaped burial mounds, Tumulus No. 4, which was built in the early Kofun period (around the middle of the 4th century) and which a total length of about 100 meters, is the largest, and includes a pit-style stone burial chamber and a cylindrical haniwa-style coffin. The interior was filled with red clay, and the exterior covered in plate-like stones and cylindrical haniwa. Grave goods recovered include triangular-rimmed divine beast bronze mirrors, jade magatama and jasper cylindrical beads. Tumulus No.4 is presumed to be one of the earliest keyhole-shaped kofun in the eastern portion of Hōki Province. 

The tumulus cluster is located 30-minutes by car from Kurayoshi Station on the JR West San'in Main Line.

See also
List of Historic Sites of Japan (Tottori)

References

External links
 Cultural properties of Tottori 

Kofun
History of Tottori Prefecture
Yurihama, Tottori
Historic Sites of Japan
Archaeological sites in Japan